Djm2mehdi may refer to:
Iranian DJ 
 Despicable Me 2, a 2013 film
 Diabetes mellitus type 2
 Dystrophia myotonica type 2
 Doxorubicin
 SpaceX Demonstration Mission 2